Logan Jones may refer to:

Logan Jones, character in Palmetto Pointe
Logan Jones, character in Zoo (TV series)
J. Logan Jones, founder of The Jones Store